Expressway R37 is an expressway in eastern Bohemia. Currently, it connects the most important cities in the eastern Bohemia: Hradec Králové and Pardubice.

None of these sections are signed as an expressway right now.

As of 2006, it has:

 19.3 km between Hradec Králové and Pardubice (5 km 4 lanes, 14.3 km 2 lanes)
 2.2 km in Pardubice
 4.5 km under construction south of Pardubice
 12.7 km in planning
 44.2 km considered

External links
  (Czech only)

Roads in the Czech Republic